Erik Weiner is an American actor, writer, comedian, and producer best known for co-creating the play The Bomb-itty of Errors and his role as Agent Sebso on HBO's Boardwalk Empire.

Career 
In 1999, he co-created and starred in The Bomb-itty of Errors, an adaptation of Shakespeare's The Comedy of Errors, blending hip-hop and Shakespeare. The show has been performed in New York City (Off-Broadway), London (West End), Chicago, Los Angeles, Amsterdam, Edinburgh, Dublin, Florida, Philadelphia, St. Louis, and continues to play around the world.

Weiner was invited to be a fellow at the Sundance Institute's Screenwriting Lab in 2002.

In 2002 Weiner co-created and starred in the MTV sketch comedy series, Scratch & Burn. He made his feature film debut in the 20th Century Fox romantic comedy, Brown Sugar, starring Sanaa Lathan, Taye Diggs, Mos Def and Queen Latifah.

In 2005, Weiner played Dragon on HBO's Unscripted, directed and executive produced by George Clooney.

Weiner's music video "Shawshank In A Minute", directed by John Landis, won JibJab's Great Sketch Experiment in 2006.

His musical comedy, NERDS, written with collaborator Jordan Allen-Dutton and music composed by Hal Goldberg, won Barrymore Awards for Outstanding New Play and Outstanding Original Music in 2007.

Weiner received three Emmy Award nominations in 2007, 2008, and 2012 for writing on Robot Chicken.

Weiner has produced such shows as America's Best Dance Crew, Snoop Dogg's Fatherhood, The Sing-Off, and served as the Head Writer on the MTV Movie Awards in 2010, 2011, and 2013. He was Creative Producer of the 2011 Emmy Awards. He was awarded a Peabody Award for his writing on CNN Heroes.

In 2010, Weiner played Agent Sebso on HBO's Boardwalk Empire, executive produced by Terence Winter and Martin Scorsese. Winter saw his 2008 YouTube video, "One Line on the Sopranos" (a tribute to the actual one line he had on The Sopranos, playing a store manager who said, "Leon, take your break at two" in the 2001 season 3 episode "Another Toothpick") Winter had written that Sopranos episode, and, thus, that one line, and this led to Mr. Weiner being cast on the series. In 2011, Mr. Weiner won a Screen Actors Guild Award for Outstanding Performance By An Ensemble In A Drama Series for Boardwalk Empire.

In 2012 and 2013, Weiner played Ian on NBC's The New Normal. In 2016, Weiner began writing and producing on The Goldbergs on ABC.

Personal life
Weiner lives in Los Angeles with his wife and two daughters.

Filmography

Acting

Film

Television

Video games

Writing

References

External links
 Official website
 Famous Last Nerds
 

Living people
American male film actors
American television writers
American male television writers
American stand-up comedians
American male television actors
21st-century American comedians
21st-century American screenwriters
21st-century American male writers
Year of birth missing (living people)